The George Moore Stakes is a Brisbane Racing Club Group 3 Thoroughbred open quality handicap, over a distance of 1200 metres, held at Eagle Farm Racecourse in Brisbane, Australia in December or late November. Prizemoney is A$200,000.

History
The current naming of the race is after the champion international jockey and horse trainer George Moore (1923–2008), who began his career in Brisbane. Amongst his many achievements he won the Doomben 10,000 which is held at the same track as this race a record five times. Takeover Target established the new track record of 1.07.88 for the 1200 metres in winning the race in 2005.

Name
 1979–1986 - XXXX Stakes
 1987 - Thornhill Park Stakes
 1988 - L J Williams Quality Handicap
 1989 - Summer Stakes
 1990–1992 L J Williams Quality Handicap
 1993 - Summer Stakes
 1994–1999 - AWA Stakes
 2000–2006 - Summer Stakes
 2008 onwards - George Moore Stakes

Grade
 1979–1982 - Group 3
 1983–2000 - Listed race
 2001 onwards Group 3

Venue
 1979–2015 - Doomben Racecourse
 2016 - Eagle Farm Racecourse
 2017 onwards - Doomben Racecourse

Winners

2021 - Zoustyle
2020 - Hard Empire
2019 - Chapter And Verse
2018 - I'm A Rippa
2017 - Monsieur Gustave
2016 - Most Important
2015 - Didntcostalot
2014 - Big Money
2013 - Lucky Hussler
2012 - Startsmeup
2011 - Adebisi
2010 - † race not held
2009 - Burdekin Blues
2008 - Friendly Embrace
2007 - ‡ race not held 
2006 - Natural Destiny
2005 - Takeover Target
2004 - Show Biz Kid
2003 - Make Mine Magic
2002 - Baal Yabba
2001 - Alpine Express
2000 - Fine Action
1999 - Major Victory
1998 - City Hall
1997 - Chief De Beers
1996 - Rip Home
1995 - Atlantic Crossing
1994 - Chief De Beers
1993 - Morden
1992 - Buck's Pride
1991 - Turvey
1990 - Gypsy Rogue
1989 - Mirraben
1989 - Mirraben
1987 - Mirraben
1986 - Paris Beau
1985 - Basic French
1984 - Fixed Flush
1983 - Foreign Interest
1982 - Marquee Star
1981 - Handsome Prince
1980 - Grand Rocky
1979 - Princess Reichen

† Meeting at Doomben was abandoned after the sixth race due to inclement weather. 
‡ The race was not run due to equine influenza.

See also
 List of Australian Group races
 Group races

References

Horse races in Australia
Open sprint category horse races